Archduke Wilhelm Franz of Austria, later Wilhelm Franz von Habsburg-Lothringen (10 February 1895 – 18 August 1948), also known as Vasyl Vyshyvanyi, was an Austrian archduke, a colonel of the Ukrainian Sich Riflemen, a poet, and a member of the House of Habsburg-Lorraine.

Biography

Background and early life

Archduke Wilhelm was the youngest son of Archduke Karl Stephan and Archduchess Maria Theresia, Princess of Tuscany. He was born in a family estate on the Lošinj island, Austrian Littoral (present day Croatia). During his arrest by the Soviet authorities he indicated the city of Pola (at the time of arrest in Italy, today Pula, Croatia). Wilhelm also indicated that his social class is "of landowners" (pomeschik; Lord of the manor) and he has no occupation. The last one was not accurate as at the moment of arrest he was a businessman-entrepreneur.

Wilhelm was growing up in parental estate located in Polish city of Żywiec, Kingdom of Galicia and Lodomeria. His father was a patriot of Poland and had inferior feelings towards Ukrainian population. Accommodating the 19th-century rise of nationalism, he decided that his branch of the Habsburg family would adopt a Polish identity and would combine a loyalty to their Habsburg family with a loyalty to Poland. Accordingly, he had his children learn Polish from an early age and tried to instill in them a sense of Polish patriotism. His oldest son, Karl-Albrecht, would become a Polish officer who refused to renounce his Polish loyalty even under torture by the Gestapo. Karl Stephan's two younger daughters would marry into the Polish noble families of Radziwill and Czartoryski.

Wilhelm, the youngest child, rebelled, and came to identify with the Poles' rivals, the Ukrainians. The younger Wilhelm was told about Ukrainians to be bandits and a tribe of robbers. In 1912 when he was 17 Wilhelm decided see this mysterious people firsthand. He boarded a train and incognito traveled to Worochta (Vorokhta) and then through number of Hutsuls villages. Failing to find any robbers, he developed a fascination with Ukrainian culture that he kept for the rest of his life.

This interest in the relatively impoverished Ukrainian people earned him the nickname of the "Red Prince". Eventually the Habsburgs came to accept and encourage this interest, and according to Timothy Snyder he was groomed by them to take a leadership role amongst the Ukrainian people in a manner similar to the one in which his father and older brother were to take amongst the Habsburgs' Polish subjects.

World War I

As Wilhelm studied at the Vienna War College, there began the World War I. Upon graduation in 1915 he went to the frontlines starting his military service in a company of the 13th Galicia Lancer (Ulan) Regiment. The regiment was dominated by Ukrainians around Zolochiv. While serving in the regiment Wilhelm started to read works of Mykhailo Hrushevsky, Ivan Franko, Taras Shevchenko and others. His soldiers gave him as a present a Ukrainian embroidered shirt-vyshyvanka which he carried under his uniform. Habsburg asked his soldiers to call him Vasyl and later for the embroidered shirt was nicknamed as Vyshyvanyi. During that period he repeatedly had to defend the Galician Ukrainians whom the local administration consisting predominantly of Poles was arresting under suspicion of disloyalty to Austria-Hungary.

In 1916 Wilhelm returned from the frontlines, as reaching the age of 21, any male member of the Habsburg House automatically became a deputy of the Austria-Hungary parliament. In parliament he came to work closely with Ukrainian deputies to the parliament of the Austro-Hungary and Metropolitan bishop Andrey Sheptytsky. He also served as a liaison between the Ukrainian community leaders and Austria's emperor Charles I whom Wilhelm knew since childhood and was even able to pay him an official visit in the beginning of 1917. The most acceptable course to solve the "Ukrainian issue", for Wilhelm, was the creation of an autonomous Great Duchy of Ukraine with federalist principles, within the Habsburg monarchy (see United States of Greater Austria). That Duchy, beside the Eastern Galicia and Bucovina provinces, could include as well Ukrainian lands that at that time belonged to the Russian Empire and which had to be reconquered.

Some researchers (e.g. Timothy Snyder) claim that Wilhelm saw himself as an ideal candidate for the role of head of state for the duchy, first of all because he was as a member of the ruling family, and second as one who already knew the language and had authority among the Ukrainians. In similar way when in 1916 the Kingdom of Poland was restored, the father of Wilhelm Stephen was considered the main candidate for the crown. According to other historians, Vasyl Vyshyvanyi personally did not lay a claim to the "Ukrainian throne" and later wrote about it stating that he would lead Ukraine only in case if majority of its residents wanted.

Ukrainian–Soviet War
Meanwhile the Russian Empire fell apart and there appeared the Ukrainian People's Republic. Following the Treaty of Brest-Litovsk Austria-Hungary and the German Empire started to help Ukraine militarily in its struggle against Bolsheviks. Promoted to the rank of captain, Vasyl Vyshyvanyi was placed in charge of the "Battle Group Archduke Wilhelm", created by the Emperor Charles I, and provided with approximately 4,000 Ukrainian soldiers and officers under his command from the Austrian Legion of Sich Riflemen and was directed to the Ukrainian South where they fought Bolsheviks. At first the Austrian forces entered the already liberated Kherson and later for two months left in Aleksandrovsk (today Zaporizhzhia) where the Archduke launched a turbulent activity: building connections between the Galician riflemen and local population, cooperated with local public organization of Prosvita, to lift military spirit along with his subordinates he visited iconic places of the Cossack history. His troops occupied a small area near the site of the old Zaporozhian Sich, and were tasked with supporting the Ukrainian national cause in any way possible. This was done by screening officials by ethnicity, creating a newspaper, and engaging in cultural work with local peasants. Wilhelm mixed easily with the local peasants, who admired his ability to live simply like his soldiers. Within Wilhelm's personal occupation zone, peasants were allowed to keep the lands that they had taken from the landlords in 1917, and Wilhelm prevented the Habsburg armed forces from requisitioning grain. Ukrainians who had resisted requisitioning elsewhere - including those who had killed German or Austrian soldiers - were given refuge within Wilhelm's territory. During time the warriors of Vasyl Vyshyvanyi came in close cooperation with warriors-Skhidniaky (for "Easterners"), particularly members of Zaporizhzhia Corps of the Ukrainian Army. These actions outraged Germany and Austrian officials in Kyiv, but increased his popularity among local Ukrainians, who referred to him as affectionately as "Kniaz Vasyl" (local correspondence to Archduke Wilhelm).

In April 1918 in Ukraine took place a coup-d'état which overthrew the Ukrainian republican government and placed former Imperial Russian general of the Svita (H. I. M. Retinue) Pavlo Skoropadskyi as the Hetman of Ukraine (local princely title). During the period of the Ukrainian State, the Germans feared that Wilhelm would create a coup and overthrow the Hetman. The Hetman was disliked by soldiers of the Zaporizhzhia Corps and Legion of Sich Riflemen. In circles of the Zaporizhzhia Division officers a plan was formed to overthrew now the Hetman and place Archduke Wilhelm Habsburg a sovereign of Ukraine. Among the most active supporters of the idea was Colonel Petro Bolbochan (later executed on order of Symon Petliura). The Archduke was uncertain of the proposition and sought consultations of Charles I who did not approve it as it would lead into disagreement with Germans. According to some researchers, the Habsburgs hoped for Ukraine to be a politically self-sufficient ally in order to counter German power.

Wilhelm and his soldiers were finally recalled out of Ukraine in October 1918 due to the revolutionary conditions there, moving to the Austrian Bukovyna. In Czernowitz (today Chernivtsi) he was placed in hospital due to tuberculosis. Through his intervention, in October 1918 two regiments of mostly Ukrainian troops were garrisoned in Lemberg (modern Lviv). This would set the stage for the declaration of the West Ukrainian People's Republic on 1 November.

As he lay in the hospital, World War I ended, Austria-Hungary fell apart, and the Habsburgs lost their throne. In Eastern Galicia the West Ukrainian National Republic was proclaimed, while the Ukrainians of Bucovina tried, unsuccessfully, to unite their land with the new Ukrainian republic. The Bucovina was occupied by the Romanian forces against whom fought Austria-Hungary and Wilhelm to avoid arrest fled to Lviv. As Lviv was occupied now by Polish forces, Wilhelm again was forced to leave it moving to the Carpathian region where he was hiding in local monasteries for almost half a year. Meanwhile while Germany was withdrawing its troops from Ukraine, the regime of Skoropadsky in Ukraine was overthrown by republican forces of "Directorate" led by Volodymyr Vynnychenko and Symon Petliura and already no one else was offering Wilhelm to become a sovereign of Ukraine.

As a Habsburg, he had become a liability to the Ukrainian cause, which was being portrayed to the Allies by its Polish enemies as an Austrian plot.

In June 1919 while traveling across Carpathians, Wilhelm was arrested by Romanian soldiers and detained for three months until on petition of the Ukrainian People's Republic he was released. He then left for Kamianets-Podilskyi that served as a capital of Ukraine. After pledging loyalty to the Ukrainian People's Republic, he was made a colonel and headed a section of international relations of the General Staff Main Department within the Ukrainian Army. In protest at Petliura's peace treaty with Poland in 1920, which he considered to be a betrayal, he resigned and lived in exile in Vienna.

Interbellum period
In an interview in a Viennese newspaper in January 1921, Wilhelm publicly rebuked Poland, condemning the pogroms in Lwów as something that would never happen in a civilized country, and referring to Poland and Poles as dishonorable. This caused a permanent, public estrangement between Wilhelm and his father Stephan. Formally he continued to be on payroll a colonel of the Ukrainian Army for a little while until the Austrian press published his anti-Polish declarations. Following that the Ukrainian government that temporarily moved to Poland officially fired him.

In 1921 Wilhelm published a book of poetry in Ukrainian, Mynayut Dni (Минають дні - The days pass).

In circles of Ukrainian political emigrants a hope was burning that the loss was not yet final and the Soviet regime could still be overthrown. In Vienna Habsburg became involved with pro Ukrainian monarchists who saw in him an opportunity, but nothing came out of it.

According to laws of the newly formed Austrian Republic every Habsburg might become a citizen as well as obtaining residency if only they would officially abandon any claims to govern. Wilhelm chose not to abandon those claims and de jure lived in Vienna illegally. Finally in 1922 he managed to obtain an empty Austrian passport where he inscribed his new name as Vasyl Vyshyvanyi. Under his Ukrainian name Vasyl Vyshyvanyi, he left Austria for Spain in 1922 from which he hoped in vain to obtain financial support for his Ukrainian adventure from his cousin, King Alfonso XIII. After Spain became republic in 1931 Vyshyvanyi moved to Paris.

In 1933 the father of Wilhelm Stephen died and Wilhelm's brothers, who inherited a brewery and land lots in Żywiec, Poland, paid off Wilhelm's debts and provided him a monthly stipend.

In Paris Vyshavanyi renewed his communications with Ukrainians when members of the newly formed Organization of Ukrainian Nationalists (OUN) found him. He twice met with head of OUN Yevhen Konovalets. Through Wilhelm, nationalists tried to find new sources of financing.

In 1935 or 1934 he became enmeshed in a criminal case in which his girlfriend Paulette Couyba tried with a help of false bank check swindle a French investor (dealers of alcohol) of hundreds of thousands of Francs. Wilhelm was invited to the meeting between Couyba and the investor, possibly to build trust. Wilhelm later himself claimed not to understand what was taking place. The arrested woman at first pleaded guilty, but later began to shift the blame on Wilhelm stating that the ill-gotten money was supposed to go to return Habsburgs to power. The sensationalistic news was picked up by the French left-wing news media which was irritated by the mere surname of the Austrian. The press sentenced Wilhelm already before trial and fearing an unjust verdict Wilhelm fled Paris for Vienna. An informant for the French police claimed that Wilhelm carried on a sexual relationship with two of his male assistants. The judges sentenced him to five years in prison, while Couyba was released.

The American historian Timothy Snyder, author of the book "Red Prince" about Wilhelm Habsburg, considers him not guilty of that crime. The researcher, as some contemporaries of Wilhelm did too, does not exclude that it was a deliberate diversion by some foreign intelligence forces (i.e. Poland, Czechoslovakia, Soviet Union) supposed to strike the Habsburgs' reputation and prevent their restoration. That theory is supported by the fact that Couyba under a false name and fictitious pretext unsuccessfully tried to go to Austria, possibly to publicize the scandal in Austria.

By that time the Austrian authorities were more supportive of the Habsburgs than in the 1920s and did not demand the renunciation by them. Wilhelm Habsburg finally was able to receive official Austrian citizenship and passport with his real name. For sometime Wilhelm considered himself a supporter of Austrian and Italian fascists, but by end of 1930s became more sympathetic towards German Nazis, which most of Habsburgs did not support and feelings were mutual. It seemed that the new war in Europe was imminent and it could give Ukrainians a chance to restore its sovereignty and also seemed that only Germany was interested in that to happen. Wilhelm Habsburg greeted the 1938 Anschluss of Austria and officially recognized himself belonging to the German nation. Soon however, Wilhelm realized that the Hitlerites would not allow for creation of independent Ukraine even as a puppet state similar to Slovakia and Croatia. After he and his brother Karl Albrecht were arrested and interrogated by Gestapo, Wilhelm changed his political views and soon joined the local anti-Nazi resistance in Vienna.

World War II, French resistance, and Banderites
It is uncertain when Wilhelm turned against the Nazis, but according to Snyder he possibly already was spying for some intelligence services, possibly the British SIS which financed and supported resistance movements throughout whole Europe, by the start of 1942. Eventually he became a spy for the French resistance against the Nazis and then the Soviet Union. In 1944 he became acquainted with some French national Paul Maas who in some documents mentioned as Masse, but possible the name is pseudonym in any case. Germans deported Maas from France to Vienna and forced him to work at the military aviation factory, creating blueprints. Maas had connections with British intelligence or French resistance movement (or possibly both).  He handed over to his curators copies of factory blueprints for parts. Wilhelm accepted Maas' offer to fight the occupiers together. Thanks to his acquaintances with German officers, Wilhelm became a source of valuable information. From him the Frenchman was receiving information about the movement of Nazi troops as well as German war industry in Austria. Later at interrogations Habsburg said that he was driven exclusively by the hatred to Nazism.

Also during the World War II, Wilhelm befriended with another Ukrainian Roman Novosad who was a student at the Vienna Music Academy. He lived close, knew Maas, and helped with some requests of Frenchmen. Through Novosad in 1944 Wilhelm heard about someone by name of Lidia Tulchyn who happened to be a contact for the Organization of Ukrainian Nationalists Bandera faction (her real name Hanna Prokopych). At the end of war the Ukrainian nationalists became aware that their chance to survive facing the Soviet threat was the union with western winning countries. The Americans, British, and French could have been interested in such union, as they worried about strengthening of the Soviet Union by results of the war. Wilhelm decided to become a middle man between OUN and those who stood after Maas.

Through Novosad, Wilhelm was acquainted Lidia with the Frenchman who agreed to cooperate with the Ukrainian nationalists and gave Lidia her first task to find German documents for a British pilot who was downed in Austria. Lidia had accomplished it. Eventually from her Wilhelm became informed that to Vienna arrived someone very important from OUN. At first Wilhelm met with him at the Novosad's apartment where he became familiar that the person was called Dmytro-Volodymyr and later also introduced him to Maas. In reality Dmytro-Volodymyr was Myroslav Prokop who was one of leaders of OUN and Ukrainian Main Liberation Council (UHVR).

In 1945 Abwehr arrested Maas, but despite torture he did not give away anyone. The Red Army soon entered Vienna and Maas was freed. However, soon he was arrested again by the Soviet SMERSH, but later released and left for his native France. Lidia also left Vienna and appeared in the camp of displaced persons in Bavaria, which was occupied by Americans. Wilhelm and Novosad decided to stay in Vienna, but risked falling into hands of the Soviets SMERSH. But soon the city was divided into occupation zones and their house appeared under British authority.

Also during the war Habsburg received monetary compensation from the German Reich for a family property in Zywiec confiscated by Nazis.  With these funds he founded three small companies in production of paint, varnish, and synthetic resin. He also joined the right-wing Austrian People's Party that won the first elections in the revived Austria and formed government. His Soviet dossier also contains a member certification of some post war Austrian Anti-Fascist Organization for Wilhelm Habsburg-Lothringen.

At some point Maas introduced Wilhelm to his colleague Jack Brier who in his turn in 1946 introduced Habsburg to French military officer Jean Pélissier. The latter informed that he was tasked by the French authorities revive contacts with Ukrainian nationalists who continued to fight the Soviet regime. Confrontation between yesterday's allies, the collective West and the Soviet Union, was becoming more obvious and eventually had grown into what now is known as the Cold War. The French representatives promised help with delivering by planes political agitation on the Soviet territory as well as Ukrainian militants who would join the Ukrainian Insurgent Army (UPA). At first the French representatives requested to meet personally with Stepan Bandera, but since it was too complicated agreed to meet someone from his closer associates. After listening to Pélissier, Wilhelm thought of Lidia, but she was somewhere in camps and his connection with her had been lost. Then Habsburg and the Frenchman decided to send Novosad to find her and, even though it was dangerous, he agreed. From Pélissier Novosad received a pass to the French occupational zone in Austrian west where it was indicated that Novosad traveled to Innsbruck conduct at a concert.

Novosad managed it, not only he reached Munich without drawing attention of Soviet military, but he also found in a camp Lidia-Hanna. As result after sometime in hotel of an Innsbruck suburb for two days met Pélissier, Mykola Lebed, Roman, Lidia, and Jack Brier. The negotiations were primarily held among Pélissier and Lebed and Novosad did not know which exactly agreements were reached, but heard from Frenchmen that they were satisfied. About at the same time through Wilhelm the French intelligence recruited another Ukrainian Vasyl Kachorovsky.

Soviet arrest

In March 1947 at his apartment in the American occupational zone of Vienna Kachorovsky too loudly celebrated his birthday and upset neighbors called the police. The Austrian law officers handed the detained over to the Soviet military or chekists. The Ministry of State Security (MGB) Counter-Intelligence Department (SMERSH) of the Central Group of Forces that was based in Austria was already interested in Kachorovsky and several months before tried to detain him, but he then managed to fight them off and flee. After interrogations of Kachorovsky in MGB became aware who were Roman Novosad and Vasyl Vyshyvanyi, while the latter one obviously had previously been trapped in field of vision of the Soviet secret service. After several months of hunting after, they first detained Novosad and then Vyshyvanyi, de facto Novosad was detained on 14 June and Habsburg on 26 August. In most documents appear dates not detention, but rather arrest when against them have already taken preventive measures 26 June and 22 September respectively. Snyder writes that Kachorovsky soon was executed, while it is unclear from what source is that information.

Novosad and Habsburg were held and interrogated in the Soviet MGB jail in Baden bei Wien. Against both of them opened one for two criminal case which to this day kept in the Kyiv archive. Later Roman was recollecting that "relationship to Wilhelm Habsburg as for chekists was quite proper", which leads to assume that he was not tortured. About relationship them to himself Novosad wrote nothing. The Archduke was given a personal plate for food, while other arrested of the jail had one plate for two.

During his imprisonment on the question of his preferred language for testimony Wilhelm answered that he can do it in Ukrainian language, but nonetheless the protocols were written in Russian. Several earlier protocols end with a phrase "The protocol is written down from my words correctly. It was read to me in comprehendible Russian language", but later were switched from "Russian" to "Ukrainian". Novosad stated that can give in Russian and Ukrainian and the investigators stopped at his first choice.

The investigators were pretty interested in the Wilhelm's distant past and his personal contacts with figures of the First Liberation War i.e. Petro Bolbochan, Symon Petliura, Pavlo Skoropadskyi, but the most attention was paid to cooperation with Maas, Pélissier, and Lidia Tulchyn. At his interrogation the Archduke tried to down play his role in the Ukrainian revolution, for example he claimed that in 1919 during times of Directoria in Kamianets-Podilskyi he was an interpreter. Also in earlier protocols Habsburg said that the meeting near Innsbruck was dedicated to not making contacts between Frenchmen and OUN, but the fate of Ukrainians in the camps for displaced people. But with time recognized everything about what Novosad already managed to tell.

Despite that suspects every time were placing their signatures under the phrase "written correctly from my words", some answers in protocols obviously were formulated by the investigators. "My stay in Ukraine was the result of an aggressive policy of Austria-Hungary imperialistic and ruling circles", hardly Habsburg spoke in such Soviet propagandistic clichés. This feature is characteristic of many protocols of the Stalin era.

In November 1947 the chekists of the Central Group of Forces decided to transfer the case and the arrested to their Ukrainian colleagues and before the New Year they brought them to Kyiv. The interrogations were renewed already in January 1948 after the holidays. The Ukrainian investigators did not start from beginning, but rather turned to the subject that interested them the most, the Brits. The chekists insisted that Novosad and Habsburg through Maas deliberately worked specifically for the Great Britain special services, not the French Resistance intelligence. At beginning Habsburg tried to resist and persuaded that Novosad told about Maas connections with Brits after the latter already returned to France, but later gave up and admitted (or "admitted"). Interrogation continued until May 1948, subsequently, the defendants were transferred from the MGB internal jail to the MVD jail #1, better known as Lukyanivska Prison.

Beside the testimonies of Habsburg, Novosad, Kachorovsky, to the case were also added as evidence filed the testimony of several others Ukrainian nationalists. One of them, for example, claimed that heard about contacts of Habsburg with the OUN. They also filed an extract from a book "Ukrainskie sechevye streltsy" that was published in Lwow in 1935 mentioning about the stay of William at the Ukraine's south in 1918.

Indictment
In his indictment, Wilhelm Habsburg-Lothringen was charged with the following:
 During World War I "carried out the aggressive plans of the Austro-Hungarian ruling circles and prepared to become the hetman of Ukraine"
 Fought against the Soviet Army in 1918 (in reality it was the Red Army)
 Served under Symon Petliura
 Launched nationalist activities in exile
 In 1944 he was recruited by the British intelligence and performed its tasks (A strange bullet as in the indictment it is nothing said about the role of Habsburg in establishing contacts between Maas and OUN, only with Germans.)
 In 1945 he was an agent of the French intelligence service, recruited agents, organized negotiations with OUN and Austrian People's Party

Timothy Snyder justly notes about the charges, "Soviet legislation was retroactive and extraterritorial, it was stretching for decades before formation of the Soviet Union and across lands over which Moscow never had its sovereignty".

The Novosad's list was smaller: belonging to the nationalist organization "Sich" (in reality it was a society of Ukrainian students in Vienna established in 1868), connections with Habsburg and OUN, worked for English and French intelligence services.

The indictment contains articles of two criminal codes at once: for the Penal Code of Russian SFSR relied chekists in Vienna, while for the Penal Code of Ukrainian SSR – in Kyiv. Roman was charged with espionage and participation in counter-revolutionary organization, Wilhelm the same thing plus "armed uprising or invasion for counter-revolutionary purposes over the Soviet territory". These were all different paragraphs of the same "counter-revolutionary" article, in Ukrainian penal code it was the article 54, in Russian – 58.

As most "counter-revolutionary" cases of that time, the fate of Habsburg and Novosad had to be decided not in court but by the MGB Special Meeting. It was an extrajudicial organ that carried out their decision in the mode of "conveyor belt", without any defendants, witnesses, or lawyers. In fact, the decision was made by Limarchenko who signed the indictment: he was asking the Special Meeting sentenced both to 25 years of forced labor camps. At that moment it was the maximum punishment as the year earlier the Soviet authorities for some time abolished the death penalty. Then Limarchenko issued a ruling according to which Roman and Vasily were to sit in a MVD special camp. The Special Meeting that held session in July 1948 decided, as the investigation requested, giving both the accused 25 years of imprisonment. At the same time, Roman had to serve his sentence in the camp, and Wilhelm - in prison, which was much more difficult. On 12 August, chekists in Moscow determined exactly where Wilhelm would sit, in the infamous Vladimir Central Prison (Vladimirsky Tsentral), which had a special status.

But they ran out of time before officially announcing the decision of Special Meeting to Wilhelm, as on 1 July from the 17th chamber of the Lukyanovka Prison he was delivered to the prison hospital. The prisoner complained about weakness, dizziness, cough, and pain in heart and chest. The doctors discovered bilateral cavernous pulmonary tuberculosis in open form. At 23rd hour on 18 August 1948 Wilhelm Habsburg died from tuberculosis after spending a month and half in the hospital. The documents do not inform where he was buried. There is an assumption that the nameless grave is located in the courtyard of the prison or the Lukyanivka Cemetery.

Austria sent requests for the fate of its citizen to the Soviet Union. In response, there came only a certificate of sentence, while the death of the prisoner was hidden. There were even rumors throughout Vienna that Wilhelm Habsburg-Lothringen was seen alive in the Soviet Union. In 1952, the authorities of the Austrian Republic decided: a passport was issued to him illegally in the 1930s - after all, he did not give up his right to the throne - and therefore revoked his citizenship.

Rehabilitation

During the times of perestroika in 1989, the Soviet Office of Military Prosecutor fully rehabilitated both Habsburg and Novosad. It was Novosad who became the author of first publication about Wilhelm Habsburg in the independent Ukraine, in 1992 his recollections printed the magazine "Ukrayina". By that time the name of Archduke was forgotten. In 1994 the declassified case of Habsburg and Novosad was transferred from the SBU Archive to the Central State Archive of public associations of Ukraine. In 2005 all personal documents and photographs of Habsburg that were kept in his dossier were transferred through the German Ambassador in Ukraine Dietmar Stüdemann to Wilhelm's nephew and citizen of Germany Leo Habsburg-Lothringen. In dossier were kept copies of the documents.

Ancestry

Notes

Further reading
 Timothy Snyder, The Red Prince: The Secret Lives of A Habsburg Archduke (Basic Books, 2008);

External links

 On the biography of Wilhelm Habsburg 
 HABSBURG–LOTRINGEN, Archduke Wilhelm 
 Archduke Wilhelm von Österreich-Toskana 

1895 births
1948 deaths
People from Pula
Austrian people who died in prison custody
Austrian people who died in Soviet detention
Inmates of Lukyanivska Prison
20th-century Austrian poets
Ukrainian male poets
Ukrainian monarchists
Austro-Hungarian people of World War I
Spies who died in prison custody
Western spies against the Eastern Bloc
Ukrainian War of Independence
Austrian princes
Knights of the Golden Fleece of Austria
Recipients of the Iron Cross, 2nd class
Theresian Military Academy alumni